John Hulle may refer to:

John Hulle (MP for Wilton) (fl. 1388)
John Hulle (MP for Totnes) (fl.1402)

See also
John Hull (disambiguation)